The aim of the Montcada Municipal Museum, founded in 1982 and housed in the old Casa de la Vila de Montcada i Reixac (Spain) since 1987, aims to recover, conserve and protect local heritage. Among its collection, it is worth mentioning the findings from the Iberian settlement of Les Maleses, in the Catalan Coastal Range in the outskirts of Montcada. The museum also has a permanent exhibition divided into five areas: the environment, mineralogy and palaeontology; prehistory; the Iberian world; medieval and modern Montcada; and, finally, contemporary Montcada. The Museum is part of the Barcelona Provincial Council Local Museum Network.

Gallery

References

External links
 Museum page at City Council website
 Local Museum Network website

Museums established in 1982
Barcelona Provincial Council Local Museum Network
Montcada i Reixac
Buildings and structures in Vallès Occidental
History museums in Catalonia
Local museums in Spain
1982 establishments in Spain